The Musée en Herbe is an art museum for children, located at 23 rue de L'Arbre-Sec in Paris, France. It was formerly in the Jardin d'Acclimatation, Bois de Boulogne, Paris. 

The museum was established in 1975 by Sylvie Girardet and Claire Merleau-Ponty. It presents a series of art exhibits and workshops for children, based on the works of artists such as Marc Chagall, Pablo Picasso, and Niki de Saint Phalle.

It is open daily, and an admission fee is charged.

See also 
 List of museums in Paris

References 
 Musée en Herbe
 Paris.org entry
 Museums of Paris entry
 ParisInfo entry

Art museums and galleries in Paris
Children's museums
Art museums established in 1975
Musee en Herbe
Buildings and structures in the 16th arrondissement of Paris
Child-related organizations in France